Peter Jones (3 September 1879 – 7 January 1963) was a British sports shooter. He competed at the 1908 Summer Olympics and the 1912 Summer Olympics.

References

1879 births
1963 deaths
British male sport shooters
Olympic shooters of Great Britain
Shooters at the 1908 Summer Olympics
Shooters at the 1912 Summer Olympics
Sportspeople from Edinburgh
20th-century British people